Lejla Kalamujić is a queer writer from Bosnia and Herzegovina. She writes prose, essays and reviews with central topics of sexuality, madness, and death. Her Call me Esteban short stories collection received the “Edo Budisa” literary award of Istria region in 2016 and it was the Bosnian-Herzegovinian nominee for the European Union Prize for Literature in the same year.

Biography
Kalamujić was born in Sarajevo in 1980. She graduated from the Department of Philosophy and Sociology at the Faculty of Philosophy in Sarajevo. 

In 2008 she published her first collection of stories Anatomija osmijeha (“The Anatomy of a Smile”, published by Naklada Zoro, Sarajevo, Bosnia and Herzegovina). In 2015 she published her second short stories collection Zovite me Esteban (“Call me Esteban”, published by Dobra knjiga, Sarajevo, Bosnia and Herzegovina). Zovite me Esteban was later published in three more countries: by Red Box, Belgrade, 2016, Sandorf, Zagreb, 2017 and by Blesok, Skopje, 2017 -Викајте mе Естебан (Call Me Esteban) translated by Goko Zdraveski. Kalamujic is inspired by the combination of her personal experience, social environment, and women authors throughout the history of literature:

The Anatomy of a Smile ("Anatomija Osmijeha") 
The Anatomy of a Smile is a short story collection where Kalamujic writes about human suffering and human happiness. “The Anatomy of a Smile” is Naklada Zoro first prize winner for collection of unpublished stories in 2008. Vladimir Arsenic describes the collection:

Call me Esteban ("Zovite me Esteban") 
Call me Esteban is a short stories collection that won “Edo Budisa” literary award of Istria region - Regione Istriana in 2016 and it was Bosnian-Herzegovinian nominee for European Union Prize for Literature in 2016. With her story collection “Zovite me Esteban” (engl. Call me Esteban), Kalamujic won the literary scene in the country and in the region. The collection was first published in 2015 by Dobra knjiga in Sarajevo, BiH and was later published in three more countries: by Red Box, Belgrade, 2016, Sandorf, Zagreb, 2017 and by Blesok, Skopje, 2017 -Викајте mе Естебан (Call Me Esteban) translated by Goko Zdraveski.  The book is said to be "by any means, the most brutal, if not the bravest, coming out of the representatives of new generation of writers in the region so far." Sandorf publisher describes the book :
Short story Call me Esteban was translated into English language by Jennifer H. Zoble:

Awards and scholarships 
Kalamujic received the following scholarships and fellowships:
 Landis & Gyr Stiftung (Fellowship), Zug (Switzerland) May/October 2017
 Writers’ House Residence, Pazin (Croatia), February, 2017
 Krokodil – Artist in Residence, Belgrade (Serbia), January 2017
 Museums Quartier Artist in Residence – Vienna (Austria) February/March 2016
 Pristina has no River, Pristina (Kosovo), October 2015
 DAAD Foundation (one month scholarship at Ruhr University), Bochum (Germany) 2006. 
Kalamujic won the following awards:
 Best short story Regional “Write Queer” contest by Queer Montenegro award (2016) - short story Nesretni život Sofije R / The miserable life of Sofija R
 Nominated for European Union Prize for Literature in 2016 award - collection of short stories Zovite me Esteban / Call me Esteban
 Edo Budisa literary award of Istria region / Regione Istriana (2016) - collection of short stories Zovite me Esteban / Call me Esteban
 First prize Susreti Zija Dizdarević award (2015) - short story Dolce Vita
 First prize Vox Feminae award (2011) - short story Žena zvana čežnja / Woman called Desire
 Second prize Susreti Zija Dizdarević award (2009) - short story Povratak među zvijezde / The return to the Stars
 First prize Naklada Zoro award (2008) - collection of short stories Anatomija osmijeha / The Anatomy of a Smile
 Second prize Susreti Zija Dizdarević award (2005) - short story Oči smrti / The eyes of the Death
 Super Cyber Story Pincom award (2005) - short story Sanduq el dunya

Selected works
Short stories (in Bosnian language):
 Sneg je opet, Snežana
 Ljeto kratke priče
 Četiri godišnje doba
 Dolce Vita
 Priča o sevdahu
 Čarobnjak
 From the collection "Call me Esteban" 
 Bella Ciao 
 Buka, bijes i ona
 Zovite me Esteban
 Nesretni život Sofije R

References

External links 
 Interviews
 Bosna i Hercegovina je zemlja traumatiziranih ljudi, ali psihičke bolesti i tegobe su tabu-tema, Večernji list, 2017
 Am meisten vermissen? Die Sonnenuntergänge über dem Zugersee, Centralplus, 2017
 Lejla Kalamujić: Ateistička parcela na Barama mi se nametnula kao nulta tačka novog vremena, Oslobođenje, 2016
 Lejla Kalamujić: Smrt mi je došla kao igračka kojom se vrijedilo igrati, Radio Sarajevo, 2016

 Call me Esteban reviews 
 Zovite me Esteban: Hommage majci i jednom vječno izgubljenom vremenu, Srđan Sandić. Najbolje knjige, 2017 (in Croatian)
 Prikaz knjige "Zovite me Esteban": Šta je meni moj život?, Lamija Begagić, 2016 (in Bosnian)
 Zašto umiru vrapčići, Elma Porobić, Behar - Časopis za književnost i društvena pitanja, 2017 (in Bosnian)
 Kafkina Alisa, Nebojša Marić, LINKS, 2016 (in Serbian)
 Chiamatemi Esteban, Francesca Rolandi, Q Code Magazine, 2017 (in Italian)

1980 births
Living people
University of Sarajevo alumni
Queer writers
20th-century Bosnia and Herzegovina women
21st-century Bosnia and Herzegovina writers
21st-century Bosnia and Herzegovina women writers
Writers